Giovanni Battista Ignoffo (born 3 April 1977) is an Italian professional football manager and a former player, currently in charge as head coach of Serie D club Acireale.

Playing career
A defender, Ignoffo started his career in his native Sicily, making his professional debut with Palermo.

He played 14 games and scored 1 goal in the Serie A in the 2003–04 season for Perugia Calcio.

Coaching career
After retirement, he joined Benevento as a youth coach in 2014. He left Benevento in 2017 to become the Under-17 coach of Palermo.

On 1 August 2019 he was named new head coach of Serie C club Avellino, a former club of his as a player. The season started well, with 3 victories in first 4 games and 5th spot in the standings. However, on 16 October 2019, he was dismissed by Avellino, with the club gaining 1 point in 5 latest games and dropping to 14th position in the table.

On 18 August 2021, he was hired as a head coach by Serie D club San Luca. After starting the season with 3 victories, the club then gained 4 ties and 3 losses in the following 7 games, and Ignoffo was fired on 9 November 2021.

On 27 December 2022, Ignoffo was confirmed as the new head coach of Serie D club Acireale.

Honours
Perugia
UEFA Intertoto Cup: 2003

References

External links
 

1977 births
Sportspeople from the Province of Palermo
People from Monreale
Living people
Italian footballers
Italy youth international footballers
Association football defenders
Serie A players
Palermo F.C. players
U.C. AlbinoLeffe players
U.S. Avellino 1912 players
A.C. Perugia Calcio players
S.S.C. Napoli players
U.S. Salernitana 1919 players
Calcio Foggia 1920 players
Benevento Calcio players
Footballers from Sicily
Italian football managers
U.S. Avellino 1912 managers
Serie C managers
Serie D managers